Babad Tanah Jawi ("History of the land of Java"), is a generic title for many manuscripts written in the Javanese language. Their arrangements and details vary, and no copies of any of the manuscripts are older than the 18th century.

Due to the scarcity and limitations of primary historical records, Babad Tanah Jawi, is one of a number of accounts of Indonesian legends that scholars use to help illuminate aspects of the spread of Islam in Indonesia, the dominant religion in the Indonesian archipelago since the 16th century.

The texts attribute the first Javanese conversions to Islam to the Wali Sanga ("nine saints"), although their names and relationships vary across the texts to the extent that perfect reduction and agreement between them is not possible. Although most of the manuscripts accept the convention of nine saints, a number list ten. These names commonly appear throughout the Babad Tanah Jawi texts:
Sunan Ngampel-Denta
Sunan Kudus
Sunan Murya
Sunan Bonang
Sunan Giri
Sunan Kalijaga
Sunan Sitijenar
Sunan Gunungjati
Sunan Walilanang
Sunan Bayat (an oft-mentioned tenth saint)

See also
Sejarah Banten

References

Further reading
Hans Ras, The Babad Tanah Jawi and its reliability. Questions of content, structure and function. In: C.D. Grijns and S.O. Robson (eds.), Cultural contact and textual interpretation. Papers from the Fourth European Colloquium on Malay and Indonesian Studies, held in Leiden in 1983 (1986, Dordrecht, Cinnaminson: Foris. VKI 115, pp. 246–273)
Hans Ras, The genesis of the Babad Tanah Jawi. Origin and function of the Javanese court chronicle. (1987, BKI 143: 343-356)

History of Islam in Indonesia
Javanese culture
Javanese literature